Alexander Og MacDonald may refer to:

Alexander Og MacDonald, 17th century chief of the MacDonalds of Dunnyveg
Alasdair Óg of Islay, mediaeval chief of the MacDonalds

See also
Alexander MacDonald (disambiguation)